The Jayewardene cabinet was the central government of Sri Lanka led by Prime Minister (later President) J. R. Jayewardene between 1977 and 1989. It was formed in July 1977 after the parliamentary election and it ended in January 1989 when Jayewardene's second limited term ended. The Jayewardene cabinet saw Sri Lanka move from being a parliamentary republic to the current executive presidency in February 1978.

Cabinet members

Non-cabinet ministers

Deputy ministers

District ministers

References

Cabinet of Sri Lanka
1977 establishments in Sri Lanka
1989 disestablishments in Sri Lanka
Cabinets established in 1977
Cabinets disestablished in 1989
J. R. Jayewardene